Kamiiso Dam  is a rockfill dam located in Hokkaido Prefecture in Japan. The dam is used for irrigation. The catchment area of the dam is 56.8 km2. The dam impounds about 44  ha of land when full and can store 3620 thousand cubic meters of water. The construction of the dam was started on 1971 and completed in 1990.

References

Dams in Hokkaido